Thailand and Vietnam were major historical rivals in Mainland Southeast Asia and still have an intense rivalry with each other. However, they have since maintained peaceful bilateral relations, especially as since Vietnam integrated with the international community beginning in 1986. Thailand has an embassy in Hanoi and Vietnam has an embassy in Bangkok. Both countries are members of ASEAN.

History

The first real contact between Siam (today called Thailand) and Vietnam was recorded in the 16th century.

Siamese-Vietnamese wars

Per historical records , Thailand (as Siam) and the Vietnamese state fought together in a massive series of wars that began in the early 18th century. However, larger conflicts were recorded from the later 18th century.

Tây Sơn unrest

After the overthrow of the Nguyễn Lord, Nguyễn Ánh, the last few survivors sought vengeance by requesting assistance from Siam, whose force conducted a massive invasion into the newly-annexed southern Vietnam and committed atrocities there. A massive blow later has Siam being beaten disastrously by the Tay Son force, led by Nguyễn Huệ.

19th century

The Siamese and Vietnamese fought two massive wars in the region, resulting in heavy destruction of Cambodia. Vietnam defeated Siam in the first, while the second ended in a stalemate. The rivalry between the two countries remained until the French invasion of Cochinchina.

Vietnam War and Khmer Rouge

Thailand participated in the Vietnam War on the side of the United States over fears of the domino theory and the communist insurgency in Thailand. Of the 12,000–15,000 Thai troops to fight in the war, over 2,000 casualties were recorded. After 1975, Thai–Vietnamese relations remained sour and very tense.

After the Vietnamese invasion of Cambodia resulted in the overthrow of the Khmer Rouge, Vietnam was in deep conflict with Thailand because of Thai opposition to Vietnam's occupation of Cambodia.. Border raids were launched between both nations, damaged much of Cambodia, and further soured relations.

Hostility between Thailand and Vietnam ended in 1989, when Vietnamese forces retreated from Cambodia.

Modern relations
After Nguyễn Văn Linh's 1986 Đổi mới reforms, Vietnam moved from socialism to more integration with the international community. As a result, Thai–Vietnamese relations have quickly improved. Thailand, a founding member of ASEAN, supported Vietnam in joining the ASEAN, which occurred in 1995. Thus, the once-poor relationship between Thailand and Vietnam has turned into one of strategic co-operation and alliance.

Economic relations
In 2015, Thailand was the tenth-largest investor in Vietnam, worth nearly US$7 billion. Thailand was also Vietnam's fifth-largest trading partner.

Football rivalry

The rise of Vietnam and subsequent rampant Vietnamese nationalism has led to the increase of rivalry between Vietnam and Thailand, which has established a heated football rivalry football.

References

External links

 
Vietnam
Thailand